is a railway station  in Ōita City, Ōita Prefecture, Japan. It is operated by JR Kyushu and is on the Kyudai Main Line.

History
This station was opened on the same day as one of several intermediate stations along the track. On 1 December 1922, the Daito Railway was nationalized and absorbed into Japanese Government Railways, (JGR) which closed the station. The station was reopened on 13 March 1988 by JR Kyushu, which had assumed control of the line and assets after the Japanese National Railways (the successor to JGR) was privatized on 1 April 1987.

Lines

Layout 
The station, which is unstaffed, consists of a side platform serving a single track. There is no station building. The shelter on the platform has a ticket window which is now unstaffed. An automatic ticket vending machine, a SUGOCA charge machine and a SUGOCA card reader are provided.

Adjacent stations

Passenger statistics
In fiscal 2016, the station was used by an average of 450 passengers daily (boarding passengers only), and it ranked 255th among the busiest stations of JR Kyushu.

See also
List of railway stations in Japan

References

External links
Furugō (JR Kyushu)

Railway stations in Ōita Prefecture
Railway stations in Japan opened in 1915
Ōita (city)